Scott Lang is a fictional character portrayed by Paul Rudd in the Marvel Cinematic Universe (MCU) media franchise, based on the Marvel Comics character of the same name and known commonly by his alias, Ant-Man. He is depicted as a thief-turned-superhero after being granted access to Hank Pym's technology and training. He is recruited by Steve Rogers to join the Avengers and befriends him, along with Clint Barton, Sam Wilson, Bucky Barnes, and Wanda Maximoff. In 2018, Lang is trapped in the Quantum Realm, but escapes in 2023, and lays the groundwork for using time travel as a means to undo The Blip. Lang and the Avengers succeed in obtaining the Infinity Stones from alternate timelines, they undo Thanos' action and defeat an alternate version of him. Lang then reunites with his girlfriend Hope van Dyne and daughter Cassie. Afterwards, Lang becomes a famous celebrity and writes a memoir of his life. In 2025, he, along with his daughter and the Pym family, get sucked back into the Quantum Realm. There he encounters Kang the Conqueror and must prevent him from escaping.

, Lang has appeared in five films after being introduced in his titular film Ant-Man (2015). An alternate version of the character also appears in the animated series What If...? (2021), with Rudd reprising the role.

Concept, creation and casting
The character of Ant-Man was originally created by Stan Lee, Larry Lieber and Jack Kirby, first appearing in Tales to Astonish #35 (September 1962). The persona was originally the brilliant scientist Hank Pym's superhero alias after inventing a substance that can change size. Pym decided to become a superhero after his first wife was killed by corrupt secret police agents during the Cold War. Hank discovered a chemical substance, which he called Pym Particles, that would allow the user to alter his size. He armed himself with a helmet that could control ants and would shrink down to the size of an insect to become the mystery-solving Ant-Man, solving crimes and stopping criminals. Pym shared his discovery with his new girlfriend Janet van Dyne, who became his crime-fighting partner The Wasp. The duo would become founding members of the Avengers, fighting recurring enemies including Pym's own robotic creation Ultron. Scott Lang was a thief who became Ant-Man after stealing the Ant-Man suit to save his daughter Cassandra "Cassie" Lang from a heart condition. Reforming from his life of crime, Lang soon took on a full-time career as Ant-Man with the encouragement of Hank Pym. He became an affiliate of the Fantastic Four, and later became a full-time member of the Avengers.

In the mid-2000s, Kevin Feige realized that Marvel still owned the rights to the core members of the Avengers, which included Ant-Man. Feige, a self-professed "fanboy", envisioned creating a shared universe just as creators Stan Lee and Jack Kirby had done with their comic books in the early 1960s. In 2005, Marvel received a $525 million investment from Merrill Lynch, allowing them to independently produce ten films, including Ant-Man. Edgar Wright had begun developing a live-action film based on the Marvel Comics superhero Ant-Man with Joe Cornish in 2006. However, in May 2014, Wright and Marvel Studios issued a joint statement announcing that Wright had exited the movie due to creative differences. According to Wright, he had been hired as writer-director but became unhappy when Marvel wanted to write a new script. In 2017, he said: "The most diplomatic answer is I wanted to make a Marvel movie but I don't think they really wanted to make an Edgar Wright movie ... having written all my other movies, that's a tough thing to move forward. Suddenly becoming a director for hire on it, you're sort of less emotionally invested and you start to wonder why you're there, really."

Wright was replaced by Peyton Reed as director, with Adam McKay and star Paul Rudd rewriting the screenplay. Wright and Cornish received both screenplay and story credits, with Wright also credited as executive producer. Regarding Rudd's casting, producer Kevin Feige said, "Look at that origin of the petty crook who comes into contact with a suit and does his best to make good, and then look at someone like Paul Rudd, who can do slightly unsavory things like break into people's houses and still be charming and who you root for and whose redemption you will find satisfaction in". Director Peyton Reed compared Lang to George Clooney's character Danny Ocean from Ocean's Eleven, saying, "He's a guy trying to create a new life for himself and find redemption". Rudd signed a multi-film contract with Marvel, with Feige saying it was "three [films]-plus-plus to appear in other things".

Fictional character biography

Early life 
Scott graduated from MIT with a degree in engineering, but turned to a life of crime to punish a corporation that had swindled its customers. While in prison, his wife Maggie divorced him and took custody of their daughter, Cassie.

Becoming Ant-Man

In 2015, Scott is released to parole and moves in with his former cellmate, Luis. He visits Cassie unannounced, and is chastised by Maggie and her fiancé, police detective Paxton, for not providing child support. Unable to hold down a job because of his criminal record, Scott agrees to join Luis and his crew in a burglary. Following a tip, Scott breaks into a house and cracks its safe, only to discover and steal an old motorcycle suit. When he tries it on, he shrinks to the size of an insect. He returns the suit to the house but is arrested and subsequently broken out of jail by the homeowner, Hank Pym.

Hank reveals that he had previously operated as the superhero named Ant-Man and had manipulated Scott into stealing the suit as a test. Hank reveals that he wants Scott to steal the Yellowjacket suit from his former protégé, Darren Cross, who has reverse-engineered Hank's technology. Hank and his daughter Hope van Dyne train Lang to fight, use the Ant-Man suit, and to control ants. Hank reveals that Hope's mother, Janet van Dyne, disappeared into the subatomic Quantum Realm while disabling a Soviet nuclear missile over 30 years prior. Hank warns Scott that he could suffer a similar fate if he overrides his suit's regulator.

Sent to steal a device from the Avengers Compound, Scott briefly fights and defeats Sam Wilson. Scott, along with his crew and a swarm of flying ants, infiltrates Pym Technologies' headquarters as Cross hosts a ceremony at the building to unveil his perfected Yellowjacket suit. Scott and Hope dispatch Hydra agents at the event and detonate explosives, imploding the building. Cross dons the Yellowjacket and takes Cassie hostage to lure Scott into a fight. Lang overrides the regulator and shrinks to subatomic size to penetrate Cross' suit and sabotages it, killing Cross. Scott disappears into the Quantum Realm, but manages to reverse the effects and returns to the macroscopic world. Out of gratitude, Paxton covers for Scott to keep him out of prison.

Recruited by Steve Rogers

In 2016, Scott is recruited by Sam to help Steve Rogers, who has gone rogue in the wake of the implementation of the Sokovia Accords. Clint Barton and Wanda Maximoff pick Scott up and take him to join Steve, Sam, and Bucky Barnes at Leipzig/Halle Airport in Germany, where they are confronted by Tony Stark, Natasha Romanoff, James Rhodes, T'Challa, Peter Parker, and Vision. During the fight, Scott uses his suit to grow to an enormous size, allowing Steve and Bucky to escape. Scott is taken down by Peter, Tony, and Rhodey, and is captured by Thaddeus Ross and sent to the Raft floating prison alongside Sam, Clint, and Wanda. They are later freed by Steve and Natasha, and Scott, alongside Clint, negotiate a deal with Ross and the U.S. government, receiving a term of house arrest.

Working with the Wasp

In 2018, Scott learns he has unknowingly become entangled with Janet van Dyne after he receives an apparent message from her from the Quantum Realm. Scott contacts Hank about Janet, who along with Hope, kidnaps Scott, leaving a decoy so as not to arouse suspicion from FBI agent Jimmy Woo. They work to build a stable tunnel so they can take a vehicle into the Quantum Realm and retrieve her and arrange to buy a part needed for the tunnel from black market dealer Sonny Burch, who realizes the potential profit that can be earned from Hank's research and double-crosses them. Wasp fights off Burch and his men until she is attacked by a quantumly unstable masked woman. Scott tries to help fight off the woman, but she escapes with Hank's lab, which has been shrunk to the size of a suitcase. Hank's estranged former partner Bill Foster helps them locate the lab, where the "Ghost" captures the trio and reveals herself to be Ava Starr. Her father Elihas, another of Hank's former partners, died along with his wife during an experiment that caused Starr's unstable state.

Foster reveals that Starr is dying and in constant pain as a result of her condition, and they plan to cure her using Janet's quantum energy. Believing that this will kill Janet, Hank refuses to help them and escapes with Hope, Scott, and the lab. Opening a stable version of the tunnel, Hank, Hope, and Scott are able to contact Janet, who gives them a precise location to find her but warns that they only have two hours before the unstable nature of the realm separates them. Scott returns home before Woo arrives, while Hank and Hope are arrested by the FBI, allowing Starr to take the lab. Scott breaks Hank and Hope out of custody and they recover the lab with Luis' help. Starr, Burch and his men attack, but Hank and Janet return safely from the Quantum Realm, and Janet voluntarily gifts some of her energy to Starr to temporarily stabilize her. Scott returns home once again, in time for a now suspicious Woo to release him from house arrest.

Later, using a smaller quantum tunnel built in Luis' van, Hank, Janet, Hope and Scott plan to harvest quantum energy to help Starr remain stable. However, while Scott is in the Quantum Realm, he suddenly becomes trapped.

Time Heist

In 2023, Scott is released from the Quantum Realm after a rat activates the quantum tunnel and he finds himself in a storage warehouse. He soon learns about the Blip, and rushes to Cassie’s house and finds she is still alive. After being informed of what happened, Scott departs California and arrives at the Avengers Compound. He explains to Steve and Natasha that he experienced only five hours within the Quantum Realm, theorizing it could serve as a means of time travel. The trio visit Tony at his house to explain their plan for a "Time Heist" to steal the Infinity Stones from alternate timelines and use them to undo the Blip, but Tony refuses. They then meet with Bruce Banner at a diner and he agrees to help them at the Compound. However, their initial attempts at time travel are unsuccessful, and Scott is turned into a baby, child, and elderly man. Tony later relents and arrives to assist. 

Once Thor, Rocket Raccoon, Nebula, Rhodey, and Clint return to the Compound, they formulate a plan. Bruce, Steve, Tony and Scott travel the Quantum Realm to an alternate universe arriving in New York City during Loki's invasion, but while Steve and Bruce retrieve the Mind and Time Stones respectively, Tony and Scott's attempt to steal the Space Stone goes awry. Scott returns to his universe with Bruce, while Tony and Steve travel to another universe in the 1970s and retrieve both the Space Stone and additional Pym Particles. Reuniting together, Bruce successfully restores the trillions of lost lives. As Scott notices that it has been successful, an alternate Thanos and his warship then arrive and attack the Compound with missiles. After saving Rocket, Bruce, and Rhodey from drowning, Scott then participates in the final battle against alternate Thanos and his army, while reuniting with a restored Hope. Scott kills Cull Obsidian, while throwing a Leviathan through an Inter-Dimensional Portal created by Masters of the Mystic Arts. After Tony sacrifices his life to save them, Scott returns home and spends time with Hope and Cassie. About a week later, Scott, along with Hope and a restored Hank and Janet, attend Tony's funeral.

Encounter with Kang

In 2025, Scott has written and released a memoir titled Look Out for the Little Guy. As he walks throughout the city, he gets recognized and greeted by strangers and when going to coffee shops or restaurants, store patrons or other people pay for him. After a book signing at a bookstore, he gets notified by the SFPD and goes to the station to get his daughter Cassie, who had shrunken a police car while trying to help a Blip-displaced homeless camp. They then return to Pym's house and have dinner where Cassie reveals that she, Hope and Hank have been working together on a quantum satellite in the basement. 

Upon opening the satellite, a portal opens and Hank and Janet are pulled into the Quantum Realm. Hope, Cassie, Scott also go in after them. Scott and Cassie are separated from the others and run across different species of beings that live in the quantum realm. Scott is told that someone is looking for him because of his association with Janet and is eventually caught by soldiers and Darren Cross, who had survived their previous encounter and became a mutated, cybernetically enhanced individual with an oversized head known as M.O.D.O.K.. Scott and Cassie are placed in prison holding cells and eventually are met by Kang the Conqueror. 

Kang interrogates Scott, revealing he needs him to reclaim a multiversal power core that powers his ship which will allow Kang to escape the quantum realm. Scott initially refuses, but later makes a deal with Kang in order to spare Cassie's life. While trying to get the multiversal core, Scott meets many other variants of himself. Scott, with the help of Hope, shrinks the engine down to its normal size.

Kang forcefully takes the engine from Scott without giving back Cassie, breaking their deal, and begins to try to make his escape. After Scott and Hope try to fight back, Kang knocks them out. Hank shows up with ants that have lived in the quantum realm and as a result have grown much smarter with their tech. Scott, Hope, and Hank then make their way to Kang’s empire to try to prevent him from escaping and to save Cassie. 

Scott engages into a brief fight with Kang until the ants swarm Kang, allowing Scott to have enough time to stop the ship from powering up. Janet is able to open a portal for them to escape, but before Scott can make it through he is confronted by Kang. Kang overpowers Scott and nearly kills him, but is saved by Hope and the two of them knock Kang into the engine, seemingly killing him. Scott and Hope then make their way through the portal and out the quantum realm. 

Days later, Scott returns to normal life, but becomes paranoid and thinks back to when Kang said he was preventing something worse from happening and begins to question if Kang is really dead or if he may have accidentally caused something worse to happen, only for him to happily shrug it off.

Alternate versions

Zombie outbreak

In an alternate 2018, following Janet van Dyne and Hank Pym's return from the Quantum Realm, Scott is attacked and turned into a zombie by the pair, who have been infected with a zombie quantum virus. Later, Vision finds the zombified Lang and takes him to Camp Lehigh, where he cures him with the Mind Stone; however, Vision is only able to preserve Scott's head in a jar. When a group of survivors arrive at the camp, Scott is aided by the Cloak of Levitation and escapes with Peter Parker and T'Challa to Wakanda.

Probability Storm

In 2025, Scott, from the 616 universe, is brought back into the Quantum Realm and is tasked by Kang the Conqueror to retrieve a Multiversal power core using his Pym Particles discs. As 616 Scott enters the Quantum nexus, he encounters a probability storm, where he meets infinite variants of himself, with one Scott having never become Ant-Man and just been a Baskin Robbins employee, and another Scott in giant form unravelling into ribbons to his death.

Characterization 
The character's first onscreen appearance finally came in 2015, with the release of Ant-Man. The film depicts Lang as a former systems engineer at VistaCorp and petty criminal who becomes the successor to Hank Pym as Ant-Man, when Pym allows him to acquire a suit that allows him to shrink in size but increase in strength. Lang then undertakes the journey of a petty criminal becoming a hero by fighting Darren Cross / Yellowjacket.

In Captain America: Civil War, Lang is recruited to fight alongside Captain America's team of the Avengers, against Iron Man's faction of the Avengers and the Sokovia Accords. During the ensuing battle, he reveals that not only can he shrink using the Pym Particles, but he can also grow to giant-sized proportions, although doing so puts great stress on his body. Ant-Man director Peyton Reed had discussed the character and the way that the Ant-Man production had shot certain sequences with the Russo brothers, saying, "As we were doing [Ant-Man] and we were in post and they were getting ready to head out to Atlanta to do Civil War, we had a lot of conversations ... It's important because there's this continuity that has to happen in this universe". On the decision to have Lang grow in size to become Giant-Man in the airport battle, Feige said, "It was just a great idea to turn the tide of the battle in a huge, shocking, unexpected way. We have a lot of ideas for [Ant-Man and the Wasp], none of which are contingent upon revealing Giant-Man, so we thought this would be the fun, unbelievable unexpected way to do that". Anthony Russo added that the transformation was the continuation of Lang's character arc from Ant-Man, saying "He's just really impressed with Captain America, he just wants to deliver and he figures out a way to deliver where he might actually tear himself in half but he's willing to do it and it works". At the beginning of Spider-Man: Homecoming, it is shown that Peter Parker shot video of the Berlin Airport fight, including a glimpse of Ant-Man in his giant form from a different angle.

Rudd next reprised his role as Ant-Man in Ant-Man and the Wasp. In April 2017, director Peyton Reed stated that Scott Lang / Ant-Man also features his other moniker of Giant-Man, first introduced in Captain America: Civil War, with a new tech-suit. Following the events at the end of Captain America: Civil War, in which Lang escapes from the Raft prison, director Peyton Reed said that "he's a fugitive in most of the first Ant-Man movie. He's just a bigger fugitive now". In the film, Lang is under house arrest for the surveillance of agent Jimmy Woo after the events of Captain America: Civil War. He is released at the hands of Hope van Dyne / Wasp, who has a relationship with him, to help Dr. Pym in creating a bridge to the quantum realm to find Janet van Dyne, and faces the criminal Sonny Burch and the villain Ghost at the hands of Bill Foster. Rudd was interested in Lang being a regular person rather than "innately heroic or super", driven by his desire to be a responsible parent. In the post-credits scene, while trying to collect quantum particles from the quantum realm, he is trapped there after Janet, Hank and Hope disappear because of Thanos' actions in Avengers: Infinity War.

Rudd reprised his role in Avengers: Endgame. In a key scene in the film, in which attempts to send Lang through time instead drastically change his age, Lang is portrayed by twins Bazlo and Loen LeClair as a baby, by Jackson A. Dunn at age 12, and by Lee Moore at age 93. This was Moore's final film before his death in August 2018. Markus and McFeely explained that adding Lang helped with implementing time travel into the film, saying, "we had access to him in the second movie, and the fact that he was bringing a whole subset of technology that did have something to do with a different concept of time was like a birthday present".

In November 2019, it was reported Ant-Man and the Wasp: Quantumania is to be helmed again by Peyton Reed with Paul Rudd expected to return as Ant-Man/Scott Lang.

In the comics, Hank Pym's Ant-Man is a founding member of the Avengers, whereas in the MCU, Pym is initially distrustful of the Avengers, Stark in particular. No iteration of Ant-Man becomes involved with the Avengers in any capacity until Lang teams up with Steve Rogers during the events of Captain America: Civil War, and Lang does not become an official Avenger until the events of Avengers: Endgame. Furthermore, in MCU continuity, Stark and Bruce Banner, rather than Pym, create Ultron.

To get in shape for the role, Rudd worked with trainers and cut alcohol, fried foods, and carbohydrates out of his diet. Rudd stated that in preparation for his role, he "basically didn't eat anything for about a year ... I took the Chris Pratt approach to training for an action movie. Eliminate anything fun for a year and then you can play a hero".

In Captain America: Civil War, Rudd's suit "is streamlined and more high-tech" than the one seen in Ant-Man.

Reception

The consensus of review aggregator website Rotten Tomatoes reads, "Led by a charming performance from Paul Rudd, Ant-Man offers Marvel thrills on an appropriately smaller scale – albeit not as smoothly as its most successful predecessors." Todd McCarthy of The Hollywood Reporter remarked, "Although the story dynamics are fundamentally silly and the family stuff, with its parallel father-daughter melodrama, is elemental button-pushing, a good cast led by a winning Paul Rudd puts the nonsense over in reasonably disarming fashion."

For Ant-Man and the Wasp, the critical consensus on Rotten Tomatoes reads, "A lighter, brighter superhero movie powered by the effortless charisma of Paul Rudd and Evangeline Lilly, Ant-Man and The Wasp offers a much-needed MCU palate cleanser." Simon Abrams of RogerEbert.com felt that the film managed to juggle its many subplots while giving Rudd's Lang some decent character development. Peter Travers, writing for Rolling Stone, gave the film 3 out of 4 stars and praised Rudd and Lilly, as did Manohla Dargis at The New York Times, who praised Rudd, and felt Lilly found "her groove" in the film, while Stephanie Zachareck, writing for Time, thought the film had reasonably fun action and stand-out moments between Rudd and Abby Ryder Fortson as daughter Cassie, but felt the focus on Lilly as a better hero than Rudd was "just checking off boxes in the name of gender equality."

Richard Roeper of the Chicago Sun-Times also praised the cast, especially Rudd and Fortson, while Ann Hornaday of The Washington Post called the film "instantly forgettable" and criticized its plot, but still found the film enjoyable, particularly praising Rudd along with the action and effects.

Accolades

See also
Characters of the Marvel Cinematic Universe

Notes

References

External links
 Scott Lang on the Marvel Cinematic Universe Wiki
 
 Scott Lang on Marvel.com

Ant-Man (film series)
Ant-Man
Fictional Massachusetts Institute of Technology people
Fictional characters displaced in time
Fictional characters from San Francisco
Fictional characters who can change size
Fictional electrical engineers
Fictional genocide survivors
Fictional people from the 21st-century
Fictional prisoners and detainees in the United States
Fictional professional thieves
Fictional vigilantes
Fictional writers
Film characters introduced in 2015
Male characters in film
Marvel Cinematic Universe characters
Marvel Comics American superheroes
Marvel Comics male superheroes